The A Three-Layer Architecture for Navigating Through Intricate Situations (ATLANTIS) is a hybrid reactive/deliberative robot architecture developed by Erann Gat at the Jet Propulsion Laboratory.

See also 
 Three-layer architecture
 Servo, subsumption, and symbolic (SSS) architecture
 Distributed architecture for mobile navigation (DAMN)
 Autonomous robot architecture (AuRA)

References

Robot architectures